Frederick Ayers (8 May 1912 – 18 August 1986) was an Australian rules footballer who played with Carlton in the Victorian Football League (VFL).

Notes

References

External links 

Fred Ayers's profile at Blueseum

1912 births
1986 deaths
Australian rules footballers from Victoria (Australia)
Australian Rules footballers: place kick exponents
Carlton Football Club players